Coeliades fervida is a butterfly in the family Hesperiidae. It is found in eastern, south-eastern and central Madagascar. The habitat consists of forests and forest margins.

References

Butterflies described in 1880
Coeliadinae
Butterflies of Africa
Taxa named by Arthur Gardiner Butler